Bushy seedbox is a common name for several plants in the genus Ludwigia, and may refer to:

 Ludwigia alternifolia, found in North America

References

Ludwigia (plant)